Eupithecia marmorea is a moth in the family Geometridae first described by András Mátyás Vojnits in 1983. It is found in Nepal.

References

Moths described in 1983
marmorea
Moths of Asia